0-3-0 is a type of wheel arrangement for a monorail steam locomotive.

History

This most unusual wheel arrangement was only used for specialised monorails.

Listowel and Ballybunion Railway
The Lartigue Monorail locomotives used on the Listowel and Ballybunion Railway were of 0-3-0 wheel arrangement, although they also required non-load-bearing guide wheels. These locomotives were built by the Hunslet Engine Company, Leeds in 1888.

Patiala State Monorail Trainways

Four locomotives were built with this wheel arrangement in 1907 for the Patiala State Monorail Trainways, a monorail line in Patiala, India. They had double flanged driving wheels and the locomotives had an outrigger wheel that ran on the ground. The builder was Orenstein & Koppel of Berlin, one locomotive is preserved in working order at the National Rail Museum, New Delhi, New Delhi.

Also, in the Russian notation that counts axles instead of wheels, 0-3-0 is identical to Whyte's 0-6-0.

References

Monorails
3,0-3-0